{{Taxobox
| name = Paratilapia sp. nov. 'Vevembe| image = 
| status = CR | status_system = IUCN3.1
| regnum = Animalia
| phylum = Chordata
| classis = Actinopterygii
| ordo = Perciformes
| familia = Cichlidae
| genus = Paratilapia
| species = P. sp. nov. 'Vevembe'| binomial = Paratilapia sp. nov. 'Vevembe| binomial_authority = 
| synonyms = 
}}Paratilapia sp. nov. 'Vevembe' is a species of fish in the family Cichlidae. It is endemic to Madagascar.  Its natural habitats are rivers and swamps. It is threatened by habitat loss.

Sources
 Loiselle, P. & participants of the CBSG/ANGAP CAMP "Faune de Madagascar" workshop 2004.  Paratilapia sp. nov. 'Vevembe'.   2006 IUCN Red List of Threatened Species.   Downloaded on 4 August 2007.

Paratilapia
Freshwater fish of Madagascar
Undescribed vertebrate species
Taxonomy articles created by Polbot
Taxobox binomials not recognized by IUCN